Conilithes allioni is an extinct species of sea snail, a marine gastropod mollusk, in the family Conidae, the cone snails and their allies.

Distribution
This species occurs in the following locations:
 Austria
 Germany

References

Conidae